Baidu Maps is a desktop and mobile web mapping service application and technology provided by Baidu, offering satellite imagery, street maps, street view ("Panorama" - :zh:百度全景) and indoor view perspectives, as well as functions such as a route planner for traveling by foot, car, or with public transport. Android and iOS applications are available.

Baidu Maps is available only in the Chinese language and, before 2016, it offered only maps of mainland China, Hong Kong, Macau and Taiwan, with the rest of the world appearing unexplored. Currently Baidu Maps also offers maps of various other countries. It was reported that more than 150 countries would be supported by the end of 2016. Baidu uses map data supplied by NavInfo, MapKing, Here, LocalKing and OpenStreetMap.

In 2016, it was reported that Baidu Maps had over 348 million monthly active users.

Countries and territories supported

Within Mainland China
 Mainland China

Outside Mainland China

History 
 September 2005 - Baidu Maps is released
 2010 - Baidu adds a unique, highly detailed 3D view for select cities, very similar to the computer game SimCity. The images are licensed from digital mapping service Edushi. Cities being currently covered include Beijing, Shanghai, Guangzhou and Shenzhen.
 November 2011 - Baidu launches satellite imagery for the Greater China region with much better resolution than Google Maps City-level only includes Beijing, Shanghai, Guangzhou, Shenzhen, Hong Kong, Macao and other major cities.
 September 3, 2012 - at its annual Baidu World event, Baidu reveals 360-degree digital imagery for select buildings

Coordinate system 

Baidu Maps uses a variant of web Mercator projection for slicing map data into tiles, with distances expressed in degrees. It's associated with an underlying latitude-longitude reference. However, the reference uses the BD-09 coordinate system, which adds further obfuscation to the already obscure national standard in China, GCJ-02 (which in turn is defined in terms of the de facto standard around the world, WGS 84). Baidu alleges that adopting BD-09 "protects users' privacy".

The Baidu Maps API documentation specifies that "real" (WGS-84) GPS coordinates must be converted via a coordinate conversion interface. An HTTP interface, JavaScript API, Android SDK, and iOS SDK are available.

The JavaScript coordinate conversion API is demonstrated online by Baidu, but without any reverse (to GCJ-02) conversion capabilities. Open source implementations in R and various other languages exist, implemented in a manner much like the reverse GCJ-02 algorithm.

BD-09's lat-lon coordinates are derived by scrambling a polar version of GCJ-02 coordinates and adding a fixed offset:
from cmath import polar, rect
from math import sin, cos, pi
# Represent coordinates with complex numbers for simplicity
coords = complex

# baidu assumes x/real: lon; y/imag: lat here.
def gcj_bd(gcj: coords) -> coords:
    r, θ = polar(gcj)
    r += 2e-5 * sin(gcj.imag * pi * 3000 / 180)
    θ += 3e-6 * cos(gcj.real * pi * 3000 / 180)
    return rect(r, θ) + (0.0065 + 0.006j)

Street view service
The street view service of Baidu Maps was first launched on August 21, 2013. This is a list of cities supported as of March 11, 2015:

Blocking

India 

In June 2020, the Indian Government blocked Baidu Maps, as well as 58 other Chinese apps, citing national security concerns. That came after clashes between the People's Liberation Army Ground Force and the Indian Army in the Galwan Valley.

References

External links 
 Baidu Maps
 Baidu Map API example plotting markers with WGS-84, GCJ-02 and BD-09 coordinates

Baidu
Web mapping
Internet properties established in 2005
Street view services
Internet censorship in India